Maxwell Seales (born 27 August 1972) is an athlete from Saint Lucia.

He was part of the first ever team to represent Saint Lucia at the Olympic Games when he competed at the 1996 Summer Olympic Games in the 4 x 100 metres relay, the relay team finished fifth in their heat so he did not advance to the next round.

References

1972 births
Living people
Saint Lucian male sprinters
Olympic athletes of Saint Lucia
Athletes (track and field) at the 1996 Summer Olympics